Élise Fouin (born 1979) is a French designer. She was educated in Paris at Ecole Boulle.

Her designs range from spectacular interior designs to individual items such as lamps, chairs, etc. Fouin has been profiled in the French design magazine Intramuroa.

References

External links
 Official site

French designers
French interior designers
1979 births
Living people
Place of birth missing (living people)